The Silva Project is a non-profit organization centered in Corfu, Greece dedicated, in part, to the preservation of the Skyros Pony. In addition to the efforts to breed the remaining Skyros ponies, the Silva Project is also beginning work on a therapeutic riding center, an organic kiwi farm and vocational training program for people with disabilities, and a disabled-accessible tourist program for Corfu and other Ionian islands.

The Silva Project was founded by Mrs. Silvia Dimitriadis Steen, who has founded several other charitable organizations in Greece, most notably the Theotokos Institute for Special Children.

External links
The Silva Project Official Website
Born Free Foundation

Charities based in Greece
Animal charities
Animal welfare organizations based in Greece